Erasmus Darwin Peck (September 16, 1808 – December 25, 1876) was a U.S. Representative from Ohio from 1870 to 1873.

Biography 
Born in Stafford, Connecticut, Peck attended the common schools of Monson, Massachusetts and graduated from the medical department of Yale College in 1829.  He moved to Portage County, Ohio in 1830 and later to Perrysburg, Ohio to practice medicine.  He served as member of the Ohio House of Representatives from 1856 to 1859.

Congress 
Peck was elected as a Republican to the Forty-first Congress to fill the vacancy caused by the death of Truman H. Hoag.  He was reelected to the Forty-second Congress and served from April 23, 1870, to March 3, 1873.  He did not seek renomination in 1872.  He practiced medicine in Perrysburg, Ohio until his death there December 25, 1876.  He is interred in Fort Meigs Cemetery.

Sources

External links

 

1808 births
1876 deaths
People from Stafford, Connecticut
People from Perrysburg, Ohio

Yale School of Medicine alumni
Republican Party members of the Ohio House of Representatives
Physicians from Ohio
19th-century American politicians
Burials in Ohio
Republican Party members of the United States House of Representatives from Ohio